Dorcasomus is a genus of beetles in the family Cerambycidae, containing the following species:

 Dorcasomus batesi Quentin & Villiers, 1970
 Dorcasomus capensis Quentin & Villiers, 1970
 Dorcasomus delegorguei Guérin-Méneville, 1845
 Dorcasomus ebulinus (Fabricius, 1787)
 Dorcasomus gigas Aurivillius, 1914
 Dorcasomus mirabilis Quentin & Villiers, 1970
 Dorcasomus pinheyi Quentin & Villiers, 1970
 Dorcasomus urundiensis Quentin & Villiers, 1970

References

Dorcasominae